United Nations Security Council Resolution 306 was adopted on December 21, 1971. After considering the recommendation of the appointment of the Secretary-General of the United Nations, the Council recommended to the General Assembly that Kurt Waldheim be appointed for a five-year term.

The resolution was adopted unanimously at a private meeting.

See also
 List of United Nations Security Council Resolutions 301 to 400 (1971–1976)

References

External links
 
Text of the Resolution at undocs.org

 0306
 0306
December 1971 events